Bhedia railway station is a railway station of Sahibganj loop line under Howrah railway division of Eastern Railway zone. It is situated beside National Highway 2B at Bhedia in Purba Bardhaman district in the Indian state of West Bengal. Toatal 22 trains stop at Bhedia railway station.

References

Railway stations in Purba Bardhaman district
Howrah railway division